"Walkin' in My Lane" is a song recorded by Japanese singer Milet, released May 25, 2022, by SME Records. The song served as the theme song for Japanese drama Involvement in Family Affairs and was Milet's first CD single. Upon its release, "Walkin' in My Lane" peaked at number 25 on the Billboard Japan Hot 100 and number ten on the Oricon Singles Chart.

Background 
Milet has previously released multiple promotional singles and two digital singles, an uncommon move in Japan as physical CD copies are the most popular music format in the country. In April 2022, SME announced Milet's song "Walkin' in My Lane" would be pre-released digitally and that the song would be used in the Japanese drama Involvement in Family Affairs. The song was later released to digital stores on April 29. A physical CD single was announced additionally for release on May 25. Additionally, a limited version type A and B with a bonus DVD was announced for physical copies. Two B-side songs "Love When I Cry" and "My Dreams Are Made of Hell" were included on both physical and digital copies.

Commercial performance 
“Walkin' in My Lane" debuted at number 54 on the Billboard Japan Hot 100 for the week of May 18, 2022. Upon its CD single release, the song peaked at number 25  for the week of June 1. On the Oricon Digital Singles Chart, "Walkin' in My Lane" debuted and peaked at number 6. The physical release of "Walkin' in My Lane" debuted at number ten on the Oricon Singles Chart.

Track listing

Charts

Release history

References 

2022 singles
2022 songs
SME Records singles